James McNaughton (born 1997) is an Irish hurler who plays for Antrim Senior Championship club Loughgiel Shamrocks and at inter-county level with the Antrim senior hurling team. He usually lines out as a centreforward.His Snapchat is Jmcnaughton11

Career

McNaughton first came to prominence as a member of the Loughgiel Shamrocks club at juvenile and underage levels. He eventually joined the club's senior team and was a part of the 2016 County Championship-winning team. McNaughton made his first appearances at inter-county level as a member of the Antrim minor team that won the 2015 Ulster Championship before a two-year stint with the under-21 team. He joined the Antrim senior hurling team in 2017 and has since won Ulster Championship and Joe McDonagh Cup titles.

Honours

Loughgiel Shamrocks
Antrim Senior Hurling Championship: 2016

Antrim
Ulster Senior Hurling Championship: 2017 Ulster Senior Hurling Championship
Joe McDonagh Cup: 2020

References

External links
James McNaughton profile at the Antrim GAA website

1997 births
Living people
Loughgiel Shamrocks hurlers
Antrim inter-county hurlers